Flexicrurum is a genus of spiders from China similar to the genera Althepus and Leclercera. Tong and Li originally placed the genus in Ochyroceratidae, but Tong later moved it to Psilodercidae. Males are generally smaller than 2 mm, but the size of females is unknown. The name is derived from Latin flex "curved", and crur "leg", referring to the inner turned palpal tibia of the male.  three described species have been found in caves of Hainan Island.

References

Psilodercidae
Cave spiders
Spiders of China
Araneomorphae genera